The Workers Party of Ukraine (Marxist–Leninist) was established in Ukraine in March 2012. Its chairman is Oleksandr Bondarchuk.

External links
Matola, V. ''In Ukraine are registered 14 pro-Russian parties. The Ukrainian Week. 21 May 2013

Communist parties in Ukraine